Carpotroche is a genus of shrubs and trees in the family Achariaceae. It is native to the American tropics.

Taxonomy 
The following species are currently recognized:
 Carpotroche amazonica Mart. ex Eichler
 Carpotroche brasiliensis (Raddi) A.Gray
 Carpotroche criapidentata Ducke
 Carpotroche crispidentata Ducke
 Carpotroche froesiana Sleumer
 Carpotroche grandiflora Spruce ex Eichler
 Carpotroche integrifolia Kuhlm.
 Carpotroche longifolia (Poepp.) Benth.
 Carpotroche pacifica (Cuatrec.) Cuatrec.
 Carpotroche platyptera Pittier
 Carpotroche ramosii (Cuatrec.) Cuatrec.
 Carpotroche surinamensis Uittien

References 

Achariaceae
Malpighiales genera